Naseera is a small town under the union council of Sehna, Kharian, Gujrat District, Punjab, Pakistan. A natural "Kass" some time "Kassa" Nala is flowing as a boundary line between Kharian Cantt and Naseera. The main families are Sunni Muslim Rajput which leads their ancestral link to the Chib Rajpoot of Jandi chontra, [[Baba Shadi Shaheed].other families are Mughals Mirza which leads their ancestral links to Mughals of chakwal and Kashmir.

References

Towns in Gujrat District